James Smith-Stanley, Lord Strange (1716–1771) was commonly known by that title, though neither he nor his father had any claim to it.  He was the eldest son of Edward Stanley, 11th Earl of Derby, whose predecessor's heirs had used that courtesy title, but the right to two successive baronies Lord Strange (being baronies by writ) had descended to daughters, when the earldom had passed to the heir male.

James Stanley married Lucy daughter and coheir of Hugh Smith of Weald Hall, Essex, and took the additional surname Smith on his marriage.  This marriage produced Edward Smith-Stanley, 12th Earl of Derby and several other children, including Thomas Stanley (1753–1779).  He died before his father, so that the earldom passed straight to his son.

He attended Westminster School where he became a close friend of the future soldier, playwright, and politician John Burgoyne, who was to surrender his army at Saratoga in 1777. As a young man, Burgoyne  eloped with Lord Strange's sister. Burgoyne also wrote a masque to celebrate the wedding of Edward Smith-Stanley to Lady Elizabeth Hamilton, a daughter of James Hamilton, 6th Duke of Hamilton.

Public service
Lord Strange was a Member of Parliament for Lancashire from 1741 until his death.  He was Chancellor of the Duchy of Lancaster in the ministry of Lord North from 1762 and became a Privy Councillor at the same time.

As Lord Lieutenant of Lancashire during the Seven Years' War, he was tasked with calling out the Lancashire Militia, which had been disembodied since 1746. Although Lancashire's quota was only a single regiment, and despite Strange's enthusiasm, it was not until July 1760 that the regiment attained 60 per cent of its establishment and was issued with arms. Strange was then commissioned as its Colonel (15 July 1760). The regiment was finally embodied for full-tine service on 23 December that year. In October 1761 King George III presented the Regimental Colours and granted it the title 'Royal Lancashire Militia', the colonel's own company becoming 'the King's Company'. The regiment was disembodied in December 1762 as the war was coming to an end, but Strange remained its colonel for the rest of his life.

He is mentioned by Parkman as plenipotentiary to Paris and Choiseul, and advisor to Pitt, during the 1760s turbulence that attended the Treaty of Paris (1763).

Ancestry

References

1716 births
1771 deaths
Members of the Parliament of Great Britain for Lancashire
Chancellors of the Duchy of Lancaster
James Stanley
British courtesy barons and lords of Parliament
British MPs 1741–1747
British MPs 1747–1754
British MPs 1754–1761
British MPs 1761–1768
British MPs 1768–1774
Heirs apparent who never acceded
Lancashire Militia officers
Hulme Trust